Westlake/MacArthur Park station is an underground rapid transit (known locally as a subway) station on the B Line and D Line of the Los Angeles Metro Rail system. The station is located near the intersection of Wilshire Boulevard and Alvarado Street in the Los Angeles neighborhood of Westlake, after which the station is named, along with MacArthur Park, which is located across the street. Unlike most of Metro's other underground stations, which are built directly under a street, the Westlake/MacArthur Park platform is actually located south of Wilshire Boulevard and between 7th Street. This design allowed a train storage area to be built under MacArthur Park, but necessitated draining the lake for several years to excavate build the tracks.

Westlake/MacArthur Park is one of L.A's five original subway stations: when it opened in 1993, it was the western terminus of the Red Line before completion of the Wilshire/Western branch (now called the D Line) and North Hollywood branch (now called the B Line) later that decade.

Right outside the station, MacArthur Park and a lively street scene of the neighborhood's largely Mexican, Salvadorean, Guatemalan and Honduran residents stand in stark contrast to the metropolitan environment dotted with skyscrapers just one station to the east.

History 

Westlake/MacArthur Park was constructed by the Southern California Rapid Transit District, which later became part of today's LA Metro, as part of the first minimum operating segment (MOS-1) of the Metro Rail subway line. Ground was broken for the project on September 29, 1986. Construction of the short  starter line was challenging, and the Westlake/MacArthur Park station was one of the most ambitious parts of the project.

Crews would build a storage and turnback location for trains under MacArthur Park. Building the tunnel with a “pocket track” to store subway cars would involve completely draining the eight-acre MacArthur Park Lake and digging a cut-and-cover tunnel. After construction, crews refilled with 20 million gallons of water that required seven days to fill and beautified the entire park, adding a fountain, trees, benches and lighting.

The improvements were welcomed by businesses in the area. Before construction began in the late 1980s, MacArthur Park's once glittering reputation had decayed as gangs and drug dealers came into the area.

The MOS-1 segment along with Westlake/MacArthur Park station opened on January 30, 1993. Ridership on the short line was slow at first, but one major beneficiary of the new line was Langer's Deli, located about a block away from this station. The subway made it easy for downtown workers to come over to the restaurant for lunch. The owners of Langer's would later credit the subway and the improvements to MacArthur Park with saving their business, which had been struggling in the 1980s.

Westlake/MacArthur Park station would serve as the western terminus for trains for three and a half years, until the opening of MOS-2A along Wilshire Boulevard on July 13, 1996.

Service

Station layout

Hours and frequency

Connections 
, the following connections are available:
 LADOT DASH: Pico Union / Echo Park

Station artwork 
This station has two tile murals designed by Francisco Letelier, entitled El Sol (The Sun) and La Luna (The Moon). The station also has artwork by Therman Statom.

The porcelain murals, by Los Angeles artist Sonia Romero and fabricated by Mosaika Art & Design, were named one of the best public art projects in the United States by the organization Americans for the Arts.

Langer's Deli is featured in one of 13 ceramic mosaic murals located inside the MacArthur Park station.

In popular culture 
The station was also featured in the film Volcano as the Red Line subway outside MacArthur Park where a massive volcano erupted, causing an earthquake that derails Train no. 526 that was in the tunnel and lava eventually engulfed and melted it.

References 

B Line (Los Angeles Metro) stations
D Line (Los Angeles Metro) stations
Westlake, Los Angeles
Wilshire, Los Angeles
Wilshire Boulevard
Railway stations in the United States opened in 1993
1993 establishments in California